The 1940 U.S. Open was the 44th U.S. Open, June 6–9 at Canterbury Golf Club in Beachwood, Ohio, a suburb east of Cleveland. Lawson Little defeated Gene Sarazen in an 18-hole playoff to win his only professional major.

Little started the final round a stroke behind leader Frank Walsh and carded a 73 to finish at 287. Sarazen made two birdies on the back nine and did not make a bogey to also post 287 and force a playoff on Sunday.

After five holes in the playoff, Little had a four-stroke advantage and was ahead by three at the turn.  Sarazen made birdie at 11 and 14 to close the gap to one stroke with four holes to play, but could draw no closer. Little birdied the next two holes and they halved the final two holes.  Little won by three, 70 to 73, and became the fifth player to win both the U.S. Open and the U.S. Amateur.

Six players were disqualified after the final round for starting their round too early to avoid a coming storm. One of those players, Ed Oliver, actually tied Little and Sarazen, but his disqualification prevented his participation in the playoff. Walter Hagen, in his final U.S. Open, was also disqualified for showing up late for his third round.  Under current rules, Hagen would be penalised two strokes if he arrived within a grace period.  Also under current rules, officials, with access to weather radar, reserve the right to accelerate the start of the final round and change its procedure (groups of three starting at the first and tenth tees, or a shotgun start).

The top eight finishers in the tournament were all past or future major champions, and are members of the World Golf Hall of Fame.

This was the first of three majors at Canterbury. The U.S. Open returned six years later in 1946, won by Lloyd Mangrum in two playoff rounds. It was the first U.S. Open in five years, due to World War II. The PGA Championship was played at the course in 1973, won by Jack Nicklaus.

Course layout

Source:

Past champions in the field

Made the cut 

Source:

Missed the cut 

Source:

Round summaries

First round
Thursday, June 6, 1940

Source:

Second round
Friday, June 7, 1940

Source:

Third round
Saturday, June 8, 1940 (morning)

Source:

Final round
Saturday, June 8, 1940 (afternoon)

Source:

Playoff 
Sunday, June 9, 1940

Scorecard

Cumulative playoff scores, relative to par
{|class="wikitable" span = 50 style="font-size:85%;
|-
|style="background: Red;" width=10|
|Eagle
|style="background: Pink;" width=10|
|Birdie
|style="background: PaleGreen;" width=10|
|Bogey
|}
Source:

References

External links
USGA Championship Database

U.S. Open (golf)
Golf in Ohio
Beachwood, Ohio
U.S. Open
U.S. Open
U.S. Open
June 1940 sports events